"Goodbye Tonight" is the fifth single from Start Something, the second album by the Welsh rock band Lostprophets. The single was fairly unsuccessful in comparison to the other singles such as "Burn Burn" and "Last Train Home". The video for "Goodbye Tonight" stars, along with the band, Mikey Way (from My Chemical Romance) and Adam Lazzara (from Taking Back Sunday), respectively.

Track listing

(The B side of the vinyl release was an etched design rather than containing music).

Personnel
 Ian Watkins – lead vocals
 Lee Gaze – lead guitar
 Mike Lewis – rhythm guitar
 Stuart Richardson – bass guitar
 Jamie Oliver – synth, turntables, samples, vocals
 Mike Chiplin – drums, percussion

Chart positions

References

External links
www.lostprophets.com

Lostprophets songs
2004 songs
2004 singles
Song recordings produced by Eric Valentine
Columbia Records singles
Rock ballads